Red Ball Express is a 1952 World War II war film directed by Budd Boetticher and starring Jeff Chandler and Alex Nicol, featuring early screen appearances by Sidney Poitier and Hugh O'Brian. The film is based on the Red Ball Express convoys that took place after the D-Day landings in Normandy in June 1944.

Plot
In August 1944, Patton's Third Army has advanced so far following the D-Day invasion toward Paris that it cannot be supplied. To maintain the momentum, Allied headquarters establishes an elite military truck route. One racially integrated platoon of this Red Ball Express encounters private enmities, German resistance, minefields and increasingly perilous missions.

Lt. Chick Campbell, head of the platoon, clashes with Sgt. Red Kallek over an incident that occurred when they were civilian truck drivers that resulted in Kallek's brother's death.

Cast

The character of General Gordon appears to have been based on General Patton, although Patton is also specifically mentioned in the film. Major General Frank Ross, who was in charge of the real Red Ball Express, acted as a technical adviser.

Controversy
Because of the high percentage of black drivers in the Red Ball Express operation, the Department of Defense insisted to Universal that the film be modified so that "the positive angle be emphasized" regarding race relations. Director Budd Boetticher claimed:

The army wouldn't let us tell the truth about the black troops because the government figured they were expendable. Our government didn't want to admit they were kamikaze pilots. They figured if one out of ten trucks got through, they'd save Patton and his tanks.

References

External links
The Red Ball Express, YouTube 

Red Ball Express at TCMDB
Review of film at Variety

https://www.youtube.com/watch?v=IiClF0micis&t=3792s

1952 films
1950s war films
Universal Pictures films
Operation Overlord films
American black-and-white films
Films directed by Budd Boetticher
Trucker films
Western Front of World War II films
World War II films based on actual events
American war films
American World War II films
1950s English-language films
1950s American films